Uniject is a disposable, pre-filled, single-use syringe which was developed to promote vaccination in developing countries.  It was developed by PATH as part of the solution to the problem of delivering vaccines to areas which have insufficient medical workers to meet the needs of traditional, doctor-mediated vaccination programs.

History
The Uniject was invented by PATH in 1987.

In 2003 PATH accepted a Tech Award from The Tech Museum of Innovation for its development of the Uniject.

Use
The introduction of the Uniject has been called the single greatest leap forward in the battle against tetanus because it has allowed tetanus vaccines to be used in places which were previously inaccessible to health programs.

See also
Syrette

References

External links
page at PATH
product description at BD
Drug delivery devices